In organic chemistry, TADDOL is an acronym for .  These compounds are easily accessed and are often used as chiral auxiliaries.

TADDOLs consist of a dioxolane ring substituted with two mutually  groups.  They are derived from d,l-tartaric acid, an inexpensive C2-symmetric molecule.  Condensation of dimethyl ester of d,l-tartaric acid with acetone gives the acetonide, a particular kind of dioxalane.  The ester groups are susceptible to reaction with aryl Grignard reagents, leading after hydrolysis to the diol.

References

Diols
Dioxolanes